Jehovah's Witnesses believe their allegiance belongs to God's Kingdom, which they view as an actual government. They refrain from saluting the flag of any country or singing nationalistic songs, which they believe are forms of worship, although they may stand out of respect. They refuse to participate in military service—even when it is compulsory—and do not become involved in politics. 

They believe Jesus' refusal to rule the kingdoms of the world as offered by the Devil, his refusal to be made king of Israel by the Jews, and his statements that he, his followers, and his kingdom are not part of the world, provide the bases for not being involved in politics or government. Witnesses are taught that they should obey laws of the governments where they live unless such laws conflict with their beliefs, such as operating covertly in countries where their activities are banned.

Civil liberties

According to the book Judging Jehovah's Witnesses, the Witnesses have helped to widen the definition of civil liberties in most western societies, hence broadening the rights of millions of people, due to their firm stand and determination. According to the preface to the book State and Salvation: "One of the results of the Witnesses' legal battles was the long process of discussion and debate that led to the Charter of Rights, which is now part of the fundamental law of Canada. Other battles in countries around the world have involved the rights to decline military service or martial arts training, to decline to participate in political parties or governmental elections, to exercise free and anonymous speech, to exercise freedom of association, freedom of the press, freedom of religion, medical self-determination, etc. Witnesses continue to, in their words, 'defend and legally establish the Good News' around the world."

Government interactions

Australia
In 1930, the Watch Tower Society had controlling interests in several radio stations in Australia, including 5KA, where presenters were told to preach “the message of the Kingdom of Christ”, and in 1931 began broadcasting sermons of Joseph Franklin Rutherford. In 1933, the Australian government banned Rutherford's sermons, which included diatribes against the Catholic Church, the British Empire, and the United States.

On 8 January 1941, the Watch Tower Society's stations were closed down, being described as dangerous to national security. Jehovah's Witnesses was declared an illegal organization on 17 January 1941, with World War II described as "an ideal opportunity to get rid of licensees long regarded as deviant".

Canada  
 
In 1940, Jehovah's Witnesses were banned as an illegal organization under the War Measures Act.

United States
Many United States Supreme Court cases involving Jehovah's Witnesses have shaped First Amendment law. Significant cases affirmed rights such as these: 
 
 Right to Refrain from Compulsory Flag Salute - West Virginia State Board of Education vs. Barnette
 Conscientious objection to military service
 Preaching in public
 
By 1988, the U.S. Supreme Court had reviewed 71 cases involving Jehovah's Witnesses as an organization, two-thirds of which were decided in their favor. In 2002, the Watchtower Bible and Tract Society disputed an ordinance in Stratton, Ohio that required a permit in order to preach from door to door. The Supreme Court decided in favor of the Witnesses.

Philippines
In 1990, 68 Jehovah’s Witness elementary students were expelled for refusing to participate in daily flag raising ceremonies. In Ebralinag, et al. vs. Division Superintendent of Schools of Cebu, the court ruled that Jehovah's Witnesses are permitted to refrain from saluting the Philippine flag and singing the national anthem. In 1993, the Supreme Court upheld the decision in favor of the denomination.

Russia
In 2004, the Moscow City Court banned the activities of Jehovah's Witnesses in Moscow and their legal entity was liquidated.

On August 7, 2013, the Central District Court of Tver ruled that the official website of Jehovah's Witnesses should be banned throughout Russia. Jehovah's Witnesses appealed the decision to the Tver Regional Court, which on January 22, 2014, concluded that the decision of the Central District Court was unjustified.

On April 20, 2017, Russia's Supreme Court ruled to criminalize the activity of Jehovah's Witnesses in Russia; the ruling was reaffirmed on July 17, 2017.

Singapore

In 1972 the Singapore government de-registered and banned the activities of Jehovah's Witnesses on the grounds that its members refuse to perform military service (which is obligatory for all male citizens), salute the flag, or swear oaths of allegiance to the state. Singapore has banned all written materials (including Bibles) published by the International Bible Students Association and the Watchtower Bible and Tract Society, both publishing arms of the Jehovah's Witnesses. A person in possession of banned literature can be fined up to S$2,000 (US$1,460) and jailed up to 12 months for a first conviction.

France
In France, a number of court cases have involved Jehovah Witnesses and their organizations, especially on the question of their refusing blood transfusions to minor patients. These questions had far-reaching legal implications regarding the tax status of their organizations.

Association Les Témoins de Jéhovah 

Association Les Témoins de Jéhovah v. Direction des Services Fiscaux challenged the denial of tax-exempt status for Association Les Témoins de Jéhovah, the not-for-profit corporation used by Jehovah's Witnesses in France. Religious associations (“”, the legal status defined by the 1905 law on the Separation of the Churches and the State) in France can request exemption from certain taxes, including taxes on donations, if their purpose is solely to organize religious worship and they do not infringe on public order. According to the French tax administration, tax-exempt status was denied because:

On October 5, 2004, the Court of Cassation—the highest court in France for cases outside of administrative law—rejected the Witnesses' recourse against taxation at 60% of the value of some of their contributions, which the fiscal services assimilated to a legal category of donations close to that of inheritance and subject to the same taxes between non-parents. The court ruled that the tax administration could legally tax the corporation used by Jehovah's Witnesses if they received donations in the form of dons gratuits and they were not recognized as associations cultuelles.

According to the Watch Tower Society, the taxed contributions include donations for the support of humanitarian relief efforts in Rwanda in 1994. French law makes a distinction between normal non-profit associations (whose donations for humanitarian aid are not tax-exempt), non-profit associations of public usefulness (whose donations for humanitarian aid are tax exempt), and associations supporting religious activities (whose donations are tax exempt). Humanitarian aid is not considered to support religious activities and thus, accordingly, is not considered to be tax-exempt under the rules governing associations supporting religious activities. Typically, religious organizations in France providing humanitarian aid found a separate association devoted to that purpose; it may then be declared of public usefulness.

On June 30, 2011, the European Court of Human Rights (ECHR) unanimously ruled that France's imposing a retroactive tax for the years 1993 and 1996 had violated Jehovah's Witnesses' right to freedom of religion under Article 9 of the European Convention on Human Rights. On July 5, 2012, the ECHR ordered the government of France to repay €4,590,295 in taxes, plus interest, and to reimburse legal costs of €55,000. On December 11, 2012, the government of France repaid €6,373,987.31 ($8,294,320).

Other cases
Other court cases have concerned the rights for patients, or of minor patients' legal guardians, to refuse medical treatment even if there is a risk of death. For example, in a 2001 case, doctors at a French public hospital who gave blood products to a patient with an acute kidney injury were found not to have committed a mistake of a nature to involve the responsibility of the State. 

The Council stated that "there does not exist, for the doctor, an abstract and unalterable hierarchy between the obligation to treat the patient, and that to respect the will of the patient," concluding that faced with a decision to treat patients against their will, doctors do not have a legally predefined obligation to treat the patient, nor do they have a legally predefined obligation to abide by their wishes. One year later, after the adoption of the Kouchner Law on patients' rights and quality of the health system, the Council of State recalled that not respecting the patient's wishes violates his individual freedom, but the doctor did not commit a fault if under extreme conditions he performs an intervention “necessary and proportionate to its state” in order to try to save the patient's life.

In a child custody case following a divorce, a woman was denied custody of her children outside of holidays for various reasons, including her membership of Jehovah's Witnesses; the court of appeals of Nîmes considered that the educational rules applied by the Witnesses to their children were essentially inappropriate because of their hardness, their intolerance, and the obligation for children to practice proselytism. The case went before the European Court of Human Rights (ECHR), which ruled that the court should have based its decision on the mother's actual handling of her children and not on abstract, general notions pertaining to the mother's religious affiliation.

Some Witnesses requested that the National Union of the Associations for the Defense of Families and Individuals not be officially recognized as useful to the public because of its opposition to sectarian excesses which, the plaintiffs alleged, persecuted Jehovah's Witnesses. Both the Conseil d'État and the ECHR rejected their claim.

Following a lengthy administrative procedure initiated by Jehovah's Witnesses, on October 16, 2013, the Council of State condemned the refusals of the French administration to accept their religious ministers as prison chaplains, explaining that the detainees “may exercise the religion of their choice, in accordance with the suitable conditions for organising the premises, within solely the limits imposed by security and good order in the institution”. According to the French Ministry of Justice, Jehovah's Witnesses currently have 111 chaplains for their own service in prison.

Nazi Germany

Nazi Germany sent German and Austrian Jehovah's Witnesses who refused allegiance to the Nazi state and military service to concentration camps.

Other

The European Court of Human Rights has ruled in favour of the rights of Jehovah's Witnesses in many cases. For example:
 Bayatyan v. Armenia. Grand Chamber of ECHR affirms right to conscientious objection to military service. (Amnesty International. 7 July 2011) See Amnesty International Statement
 Efstratiou v. Greece (18 December 1996), Strasbourg 77/1996/696/888 (Eur. Ct. H.R.)
 Manoussakis and Others v. Greece (26 September 1996), Strasbourg 59/1995/565/651 (Eur. Ct. H.R.)
 Hoffmann v. Austria (23 June 1993), Strasbourg 15/1992/360/434 (Eur. Ct. H.R.)
 Kokkinakis v. Greece (25 May 1993), Strasbourg 3/1992/348/421 (Eur. Ct. H.R.)

In 2005 the Presiding Judge of the Provincial Court in Ruhengeri, Rwanda ruled that Witnesses should not be imprisoned for refusing to bear arms in civil defense 'night patrols' since they were willing to participate and had participated in other forms of community service. 297 Witnesses had been imprisoned on such charges in an 8-month period of 2004. 143 of those imprisoned had been severely beaten.

References

External links
Office of Public Information of Jehovah's Witnesses

Beliefs and practices of Jehovah's Witnesses
Religious abstentions